The 2011 Asian Winter Games was a multi-sport event that was held in Astana and Almaty, Kazakhstan, that began on January 30, 2011, and ended on February 6, 2011. It was the first time that Kazakhstan hosted such a large event since independence from the Soviet Union. The documents for the hosting city were signed in Kuwait on March 4, 2006.

Preparation

Costs 
Kazakh Minister of Sports Temirkhan Dosmukhambetov notes the 726 million USD for construction and renovation comes from the 2008 state budget. The Olympic village, on the other hand, will be financed by private investors. Overall, Kazakhstan is spending over $1.4 billion to get the area ready to host the games.

Venues

Astana Mayor Imangali Tasmagambetov announced venues being built include a multipurpose Sports Palace which will seat up to 15,000 spectators, a ski jump complex, a biathlon stadium, and an athlete village.

Upgrades to existing venues included modernizing the Central Stadium, the B. Sholak Sports Palace, Medeo Skating Rink, and Shimbulak Ski Resort. The ski area was increased fivefold from the current 5 km to 65 km. In 2008 a gondola lift from Medeo Skating Rink to Shymbulak Ski Resort was planned to be completed, however, only in the summer of 2010 construction really started and was under serious time pressure. The Medeo Skating rink is an outdoor rink located in the Tian Shan Mountains, about a 30-minute drive away.

In 2008, both Medeo and Shymbulak Ski Resort were rebuilt in preparation for the Games. Vladimir Smirnov, deputy head of the national ski federation, said that the resort would soon be one of the largest in the world, which would increase the chances of a successful bid to host the Olympics.

Infrastructures
Upgrades to the Almaty airport were finished by December 2008; transport issues are also being reviewed. Millions of KZT are being earmarked for work on main transportation corridors, overpasses, a ring road as well as investment in light rail transit between Talgar, Almaty, and Kaskelen. The plan also included purchases of city passenger buses, taxis, and possibly the construction of a subway.

Almaty also upgraded its power supply network of substations and transmission lines. Expansion and reconstruction of heating systems was also recommended. A portion also got into environmental stabilisation.

Torch relay

The flame of the Games was officially lit at Kuwait Towers, Kuwait City on January 11, 2011. The relay officially started in Almaty on January 12, 2011 and span around the cities of Kazakhstan for 16 days before arriving at the opening ceremony on January 30, 2011.

Sports Events
Numbers in parentheses indicate the number of medal events contested in each sport.

Olympic sports Bobsleigh, Luge, Skeleton, Snowboarding, Curling and Nordic Combined will not be contested.

Bandy and Ski Orienteering were included for the first time in the Games, while curling and snowboarding was excluded from the list, ski jumping returns to the Games, after not being contested in the last Games in Changchun.

 Alpine skiing (6)
 Bandy (1)
 Biathlon (7)
 Cross-country skiing (12)
 Figure skating (4)
 Freestyle skiing (6)
 Ice hockey (2)
 Short-track speed skating (8)
 Ski jumping (3)
 Ski orienteering (8)
 Speed skating (12)

Participating NOCs
26 countries have registered to take part and they are listed below, this is an increase of 1 from the 2007 games. Bahrain, Qatar and Singapore made their debuts, while Macau and Pakistan did not compete after competing in 2007.

Non-Competing nations
One country only sent officials.

Calendar  
In the following calendar for the 2011 Asian Winter Games, each blue box represents an event competition, such as a qualification round, on that day. The yellow boxes represent days during which medal-awarding finals for a sport were held.

Broadcasting

International Games Broadcast Services (IGBS), a joint venture between Host Broadcast Services and IMG Media, served as the host broadcaster of the games. The joint venture previously served as the host broadcaster of the 2006 Asian Games under the name Doha Asian Games Broadcast Services (DAGBS).

Medal table
Kazakhstan won the same number of gold medals on the first day of the competition as it did in the entire 2007 games, topping the medal table for the first time. Iran and Kyrgyzstan won their first ever Asian Winter Games medals, Iran in ski orienteering and alpine skiing and Kyrgyzstan in bandy. Eight countries won medals the most ever at an Asian Winter Games.

Stamps

References

External links

 
A
Asian
Asian Winter Games
Asian Winter Games
Asian Winter Games 2011
Asian Winter Games 2011
Asian Winter Games
Multi-sport events in Kazakhstan
January 2011 sports events in Asia
February 2011 sports events in Asia